Ronald Tendai Chitiza (born 4 July 1995) is a Zimbabwean footballer who plays for  side Coalville Town, where he plays as a midfielder.

Career
He was born in Bulawayo, second largest city of Zimbabwe. Playing mostly as centre forward, but also as wide midfielder, he joined Gemeg FDC in August 2012. He made 17 appearances and scored 12 goals until summer 2014 when he left the club.

Chitiza played two seasons with Ellistown & Ibstock United. Afterwards he played with Aylestone Park and Leicester Nirvana. By January 2016 Chitiza was still playing with Leicester Nirvana.

In 2016, he was part of the Team Zimbabwe UK, a team formed by Zimbabwean players living in UK, which participated in The UK 2016 AFCON.

In July 2016 he signed with Gresley F.C.

During the winter-break of the 2016–17 season, he moved to Serbia and signed with FK ČSK Čelarevo. He made his professional debut by playing as starter in the first round after the winter-break, in the round 16 of the 2016–17 Serbian First League, played on March 5, 2017, against FK Inđija, a 0–0 draw.

The following summer he moved to another Serbian club, TSC Bačka Topola, where he played during the 2017–18 Serbian First League.

On 6 July 2022, Chitiza was announced as a signing for Southern League Premier Division Central side Coalville Town, with manager Adam Stevens saying the moved suited all parties as the player had recently moved to live in Coalville.

Tendai made his Southern League Premier Division Central for Coalville Town on 6 August 2022, in an away fixture against Rushall Olympic. Coalville won the match 3-0, with Tendai completing 78 minutes of the match, before being replaced by Luke Shaw.

References

External links

1995 births
Living people
Sportspeople from Bulawayo
Zimbabwean footballers
Zimbabwean expatriate footballers
Association football forwards
Ellistown F.C. players
Leicester Nirvana F.C. players
Gresley F.C. players
FK ČSK Čelarevo players
FK TSC Bačka Topola players
Stamford A.F.C. players
Coalville Town F.C. players
Serbian First League players
Expatriate footballers in Serbia
East Midlands Counties Football League players